The Copa dos Campeões Estaduais, the "Cup of State Champions," was a competition for Brazilian association football clubs held in the years 1920 and 1936. In the absence of other notable national competitions, the winners considered themselves champions of Brazil. Participants were the champions of the states considered the then leading forces in Brazilian football.

Winners of the competitions were:

 1920: CA Paulistano from São Paulo
 1936: Atlético Mineiro from Belo Horizonte

The Taça dos Campeões Estaduais of 1914 and the Taça Ioduran, held 1917 and 1919 between the State Champions of Rio de Janeiro and São Paulo, are considered the precursors to this competition. When the Copa dos Campeões Estaduais was held first in 1920 the State Champion of Minas Gerais has been added as third participant. In the 1936 there were additional participants from the states Rio de Janeiro and Espirito Santo as well as the navy.

From 1933 forward the Torneio Rio-São Paulo established itself more and more as the leading interstate competition of Brazil, which was by 1950 given the name Torneio Roberto Gomes Pedrosa and mutated in the course of the 1970s into today's national Brazilian Championship.

Copa dos Campeões Estaduais 1920

The tournament of 1920 was held in March in Rio de Janeiro in the format of a league ("round robin"). All matches took place in the Estádio das Laranjeiras of Fluminense FC. It was the first competition organised by the Confederação Brasileira de Deportes, the precursor of today's CBF. Participants were the following winners of their state championships of 1919:
 the State Champions of Rio de Janeiro: Fluminense FC, from the city of Rio de Janeiro
 the State Champions of São Paulo: CA Paulistano from the city of São Paulo
 the State Champions of Rio Grande do Sul: Grêmio Esportivo Brasil from the city of Pelotas

Paulistano had to play without their star Rubens Salles who had to stay back in São Paulo due to undeferrable commitments. Grêmio Brasil featured Ismael Alvariza, who became in December 1920 the first player from a club outside Rio and São Paulo to play in the national team.

The matches 

Paulistano 7 × 3 Brasil de Pelotas
25 March 1920
 Paulistano: Arnaldo - Orlando (c), Carlito -  Clodoaldo, Mariano, Sergio - Zonzo, Mário Andrade, Friedenreich, Carlos Araújo, Cassiano. Coach: Angelo Bernardelli.
 Brasil: Frank - Nunes, Zabaleta - Flóriano, Rossell, Victório “Babá” (o Waldomiro) - Faria, Alberto Côrrea, Proença, Ignácio, Alvariza.
 Referee: Henrique Vignal (CR Flamengo, RJ).
 Goals: 4' Friedenreich, 11' M. Andrade, 17' Friedenreich, 25' M. Andrade, 29' Friedenreich, 42' Ignácio, 54' C. Araujo, 64' C. Araujo, 78' Proença, 82' Alberto.

Fluminense 1 × 4 Paulistano
28 March 1920
 Fluminense: Marcos Mendonça - Othelo, Chico Netto (c) - Laís, Osvaldo Gomes, Fortes - Mano, Zezé, Harry Welfare, Machado, Bacchi. Coach: Pode Pedersen.
 Paulistano: Arnaldo - Orlando (c), Carlito -  Sergio, Carlos Araújo, Mariano - Zonzo, Mário Andrade, Friedenreich, Botelho, Cassiano. Coach: Angelo Bernardelli.
 Referee: Eduardo Gibson (São Cristóvão AC, RJ).
 Goals: 2' Zezé, 40' Friedenreich, 50' M. Andrade, 69' Botelho, 89' M. Andrade.

Fluminense 6 × 2 Brasil de Pelotas
3 April 1920
 Fluminense: Marcos Mendonça - Othelo, Chico Netto - Laís, Honório, Fortes - Mário, Zezé, Harry Welfare, Machado, Bacchi. Coach: Pode Pedersen.
 Brasil: Frank - Nunes, Zabaleta - Flóriano, Rossell, Victorino - Faria, Alberto Côrrea, Proença, Ignácio, Alvariza.
 Referee: Carlos Santos (SC Mangueira, RJ).
 Goals: Welfare e Zezé, no 1º tempo, e Zezé, Pelágio Proença, Zezé, Zezé e Machado.

Final table:

Copa dos Campeões Estaduais 1936 (Champions Cup 1937 (FBF))
The 1936 tournament was organised by the Federação Brasileira de Futebol Januar 1937  and held in a league format ("round robin") with home and away legs. Participants were the five state champions of 1936 and a delegation of the sports club of the navy, which qualified through an internal process. Participating teams were:

 the State Champions of Rio de Janeiro (Federal District): Fluminense FC from Rio de Janeiro
 the State Champions of São Paulo: Associação Portuguesa de Desportos from São Paulo
 the State Champions of Minas Gerais: Atlético Mineiro from Belo Horizonte
 the State Champions of Espirito Santo: Rio Branco AC from Vitória
 the State Champions the State of Rio de Janeiro: SC Alliança from Campos dos Goytacazes
 and Liga de Sports da Marinha, the sports club of the navy, coached by the renowned Nicolas Ladany, based in  Rio de Janeiro

Atlético Mineiro, Fluminense and Portuguesa were automatically qualified. The other participants played for one more place:

Qualification

The Matches

Final table

Winner was Atlético Mineiro with the following team: Kafunga, Clóvis - Florindo, Quim - Zezé Procópio, Lola,  Bala, Alcindo - Paulista, Abraz, Alfredo Bernardino, Bazzoni, Guará, Nicola, Resende, Elair - Coach: Floriano Peixoto. Atlético usually played in a 2-3-5 formation.

References 
 Marcelo Leme de Arruda, Paulo Azeredo: Copa dos Campeões Estaduais 1920, Rec.Sport.Soccer Statistics Foundation and RSSSF Brazil, 30 August 2005.
 Marcelo Leme de Arruda, Paulo Azeredo: Copa dos Campeões Estaduais 1936, Rec.Sport.Soccer Statistics Foundation and RSSSF Brazil, 30 March 2008.
 Santiago Cruz: Torneio dos Campeões (Belo Horizonte/MG) 1967, Rec.Sport.Soccer Statistics Foundation and RSSSF Brazil, April 2006.

Notes:

Defunct football competitions in Brazil